Émilien Gailleton (born 13 July 2003) is a French rugby union player, who currently plays as a centre for Pau in the Top 14.

Early life
Born in Croydon, England to a French father and a British mother, Émilien Gailleton moved to Cahors, France at the age of three. He started rugby for his hometown club in 2008, and then joined Agen as a junior in 2017.

Club career
Gailleton made his professional debut with Agen on 15 October 2021 in a loss at Vannes, during the 2021–22 Pro D2 season.

In December 2021, he signed with Pau and joined the Top 14 club at the end of the 2021–22 season.

International career
On 30 October 2022, Gailleton was first called by Fabien Galthié to the France senior team for the Autumn internationals.

References

External links
 Section Paloise
 All.Rugby

2003 births
People from Cahors
Living people
French rugby union players
Rugby union centres
SU Agen Lot-et-Garonne players
Section Paloise players
Sportspeople from Lot (department)
Rugby union players from Croydon
French people of English descent